"Would You...?" is a song by British electronic group Touch and Go, released on 26 October 1998 in the United Kingdom as the first single from their debut album, I Find You Very Attractive (1998). The lyrics—marked by their distinctive sampling of a woman's voice saying "I've noticed you around / I find you very attractive / Would you go to bed with me?"—were originally used as part of a psychological study conducted in 1978. The song reached the number-three spot on the UK Singles Chart and became a hit in Europe, reaching the top 10 in seven countries. It was also a top-five hit in New Zealand, where it peaked at number four in early 1999.

Critical reception
An editor from Daily Record commented, "This anonymous dance hit features a lead singer who claims she is an alien. Even record label V2 are keeping her identity secret, which suggests there's a balding producer behind it." Pan-European magazine Music & Media wrote, "When an unknown girl singer meets up with an obscure soundtrack producer, what do you get? In this case, the answer is a ditty boasting some rather raunchy lyrics, driven by a jazzy beat and an absolutely irresistible trumpet part. However, the main asset of Would You...? is an absolute killer hook, which goes some way to making it one [of] the best pop singles of the year."

Commercial performance
On 1 November 1998, "Would You...?" debuted at its peak of number three on the UK Singles Chart, number two on the UK Dance Chart, and number one on the UK Indie Chart. By the end of November, it had shipped 200,000 copies in the UK, allowing it to be certified silver by the British Phonographic Industry. As well as reaching number six in Ireland, the track peaked inside the top 10 in Denmark (number seven), Greece (number nine), Italy (number two), Norway (number 10), Spain (number six), and Switzerland (number four). Elsewhere in Europe, it became a top-20 hit in Flanders, Iceland, the Netherlands, and Sweden, attaining a peak of number 11 on the Eurochart Hot 100. It was the continent's 81st-most-successful hit of 1999.

Worldwide, the song charted highly in New Zealand, peaking at number four for two weeks in January and February 1999, and entered the top 30 in Australia, where it debuted at its peak of number 27 and stayed on the chart for six weeks. In North America, it appeared on the Canadian RPM Top Singles chart, climbing to number 64 in March 1999. It was also hit on the Canadian and American dance charts, reaching number 21 on the RPM Dance chart and number six on the US Billboard Hot Dance Music/Maxi-Singles Sales chart.

As a soundtrack
The Peruvian TV channel Andina de Televisión, through its extinct gossip program Magaly Teve, used it for its section of bloopers that end with the Crazy Seal breaks TVs, and an instrumental version sounds, created by the Peruvian producer and singer Carlos Figueroa which also makes different versions of the song of Phone Gossip. Previously, the original version was used. The song was also used in Miss World 1998 during the presentation of a group of delegates, and in Miss Universe 2002, the latter with a different instrumental version during the swimsuit competition.

Track listings

 European 12-inch single
A1. "Would You...?" (Trailermen Go to Rio Mix) – 6:59
B1. "Would You...?" (radio edit) – 3:12
B2. "Would You...?" (Homewreckers Mix) – 3:54

 UK maxi-CD
 "Would You...?" (radio edit) – 3:12
 "Would You...?" (Trailermen Go to Rio Mix) – 6:59
 "Would You...?" (Homewreckers Mix) – 3:54

 US 12-inch single
A1. "Would You...? (radio edit) – 3:11
A2. "Would You...? (Trailermen Go to Rio Extended Mix) – 6:59
B1. "Would You...? (Trailermen Go to Rio Mix) – 3:11
B2. "Would You...? (Homewreckers Mix) – 3:54
B3. "Would You...? (instrumental) – 3:11
* Note: The US maxi-single switches tracks A2 and B1.

Charts and certifications

Weekly charts

Year-end charts

Certifications

In popular culture
"Would You...?" has been included on television show soundtracks such as G String Divas and the cult British series As If. The track has also been sampled for San Pellegrino, Carlsberg, and Nokia advertisements.

References

External links
 Would You...? at Discogs

1998 debut singles
1998 songs
British jazz songs
British pop songs
V2 Records singles
UK Independent Singles Chart number-one singles